Beckermet is a civil parish in the Borough of Copeland, Cumbria, England.  It contains 21 buildings that are recorded in the National Heritage List for England.  Of these, two are listed at Grade I, the highest of the three grades, three are at Grade II*, the middle grade, and the others are at Grade II, the lowest grade.  The parish contains the villages of Beckermet and Calder Bridge and the surrounding countryside.  The most important building in the parish is the former Calder Abbey; the ruins of this and associated structures are listed.  The other listed buildings include houses and associated structures, churches and a medieval font in a churchyard, a farmhouse and its gate piers and wall, two war memorials, and a telephone kiosk.


Key

Buildings

References

Citations

Sources

Lists of listed buildings in Cumbria